This is a list of windmills in Israel. Israel has five windmills, of which three are located in the center and two in the north. It also has wind turbines. Out of the five windmills, only the windmill in Haifa, one of two in the north, has no sails. Jerusalem, in the center, has the only "concentration" of windmills: two restored 19th-century windmills at a 10 minute walking distance.

Notes
Bold indicates a mill that is still standing. Italics indicates a mill with some remains surviving.

References 

Windmills
Windmills